Annam tree frog (Hyla simplex), also known as the South China tree toad, is a species of frog in the family Hylidae. It is found in southern China, Vietnam, and Laos. The Hainan tree toad (H. s. hainanensis) from Hainan Island is treated as a subspecies.

Annam tree frogs are a common, arboreal species living in montane areas, including fields, bamboo forests and shrubland. Breeding takes place in rice paddies and in permanent pools. It is potentially threatened by habitat degradation.

References

Hyla
Frogs of China
Amphibians of Laos
Amphibians of Vietnam
Amphibians described in 1901
Taxa named by Oskar Boettger
Taxonomy articles created by Polbot